The 2018 Women's World Ice Hockey Championships were the 20th such series of tournaments organised by the International Ice Hockey Federation. Teams participated at several levels of competition. The competition also served as qualifications for the 2019 competition. For the 2018 program, there was no relegations, only promotions, to raise the total at the top level up to ten nations.

Championship (Top Division)
The Top Division tournament was not held due to the 2018 Olympics.

Division I

Division I Group A
The Division I Group A tournament was played in Vaujany, France, from 8 to 14 April 2018.

Division I Group B
The Division I Group B tournament was played in Asiago, Italy, from 8 to 14 April 2018.

Division II

Division II Group A
The Division II Group A tournament was played in Maribor, Slovenia, from 31 March to 6 April 2018.

Division II Group B
The Division II Group B tournament was played in Valdemoro, Spain, from 17 to 23 March 2018.

Division II Group B Qualification
The Division II Group B Qualification tournament was played in Sofia, Bulgaria, from 4 to 9 December 2017.

References

External links
Official website of IIHF

 
World Ice Hockey Championships - Women's
IIHF Women's World Ice Hockey Championships